The Duntulm Formation is a geologic formation in Scotland. It preserves fossils dating back to the Bathonian stage of the Middle Jurassic. It forms part of the Great Estuarine Group. The lithology consists of interbedded fissile mudstone and monospecific oyster beds of Praeexogyra hebridica, with subordinate limestone and calcareous sandstone beds.

See also

 List of fossiliferous stratigraphic units in Scotland

References

 

Jurassic Scotland
Bathonian Stage